Leclercqia is a genus of early ligulate lycopsids (clubmosses), known as fossils from the Middle Devonian of Australia, North America, Germany, and Belgium. It has been placed in the Protolepidodendrales.

Species 
Distinct species include:

 Leclercqia scolopendra
 Leclercqia uncinata
 Leclercqia andrewsii

There has been question as to whether Leclercqia complexa is assigned to the correct genus; only a poorly preserved specimen exists.

Short lengths of compressed stems of Leclercqia are intermixed among several other plant types in this lens, including remains of Sawdonia ornata and Psilophyton sp. indet.

References 

Prehistoric lycophytes
Middle Devonian plants
Prehistoric lycophyte genera